Aschberg is a mountain on the border of Germany and the Czech Republic. 

It may also refer to:

 Aschberg (Schleswig-Holstein), a hill in Germany
 Olof Aschberg (1877–1960), Swedish banker
 Robert Aschberg (born 1952), Swedish journalist

See also
 Achberg, a municipality in Germany
 Ashberg Diamond